Çipi is a surname. Notable people with the surname include:

Geri Çipi (born 1976), Albanian football defender
Kreshnik Çipi (born 1958), Albanian football player and politician

See also
 Čipi, nickname of Zvonko Pantović

Albanian-language surnames